Judy Ann Santos is a Filipino actress and film producer who has received various awards and nominations for her work in film and television. At the age of eight, she began her acting career with a supporting role in the drama series Kaming Mga Ulila (1986). Santos had her breakthrough role in the drama series Mara Clara (1992) and earned her first FAMAS Award for her performance in its 1996 film adaptation. Three years later, she starred opposite Fernando Poe Jr. in the comedy drama Isusumbong Kita sa Tatay Ko (1999). It became the first Filipino film to earn more than  million at the box office, for which Santos was awarded the Box Office Queen title. The supporting role of a Chinese mogul's daughter in the family drama Mano Po 2: My Home (2003) won her a Golden Screen Award. Santos made a transition to adult roles playing a woman with dissociative identity disorder in the 2004 psychological drama Sabel, for which she received the Gawad Urian for Best Actress. For her role as the titular character in the superhero series Krystala (2005), she won the Star Award for Best Drama Actress.

Further critical and commercial success came with Jose Javier Reyess comedy drama Kasal, Kasali, Kasalo (2006), in which Santos starred opposite Ryan Agoncillo as his character's feisty and outspoken wife involved with the complexities that arise as she interacts with her family and in-laws. She won several awards, including a Metro Manila Film Festival, a Luna, and a Star Award for Best Actress. In 2009, Santos co-produced and starred in the independent film Ploning (2009). She was nominated for numerous accolades as an actress and producer, including FAMAS, Golden Screen, and Luna Awards for Best Actress. She was cast in the role of nurse Jane Alcantara in Wenn Deramass medical drama series Habang May Buhay (2010), and earned the KBP Golden Dove Award for Best Actress in a Drama Series. For her next appearance, the ensemble drama Mga Mumunting Lihim (2012), she was jointly awarded Best Actress and Best Supporting Actress alongside Iza Calzado, Janice de Belen, and Agot Isidro at the Cinemalaya Independent Film Festival. In 2015, Santos appeared in an episode of the anthology series Maalaala Mo Kaya, which earned her the Star Award for Best Single Performance by an Actress. 

Santos received her second Best Actress nomination at the Cinemalaya Independent Film Festival for her role in the drama Kusina (2016). She played a married woman who discovers her husband's infidelity in the comedy Ang Dalawang Mrs. Reyes in 2018, and garnered a Comedy Actress of the Year win at the Box Office Entertainment Awards. In 2019, Santos portrayed a Muslim woman caring for her cancer-stricken daughter while her husband is deployed in Brillante Mendozas war drama Mindanao. She won Best Actress at the Cairo International Film Festival, becoming the second Filipino, after Nora Aunor, to receive the top acting honor. Santos is the recipient of many honorary awards, including the Dekada Award from the Golden Screen and Star Awards.

Awards and nominations

See also
 Judy Ann Santos filmography

Notes

References

External links
 

Lists of awards received by Filipino actor